The Most Reverend is an honorific style given to certain high-ranking religious figures, primarily within the historic denominations of Christianity, but occasionally also in more modern traditions. It is a variant of the more common style "The Reverend".

Anglican
In the Anglican Communion, the style is applied to archbishops (including those who, for historical reasons, bear an alternative title, such as presiding bishop), rather than the style "The Right Reverend" which is used by other bishops. "The Most Reverend" is used by both primates (the senior archbishop of each independent national or regional church) and metropolitan archbishops (as metropolitan of an ecclesiastical province within a national or regional church).

Retired archbishops usually revert to being styled "The Right Reverend", although they may be appointed "archbishop emeritus" by their province on retirement, in which case they retain the title "archbishop" and the style "The Most Reverend", as a courtesy. Archbishop Desmond Tutu was a prominent example. Uniquely within Anglicanism, for historical reasons, the Bishop of Meath and Kildare is also given this style, despite not being an archbishop.

Catholic
In the Catholic Church, two different systems may be found. In England, Scotland, Wales, and a number of Commonwealth nations, the system is identical to that described for Anglicanism. Archbishops bear the style "The Most Reverend", with other bishops styled "The Right Reverend". In other countries, all bishops are styled "The Most Reverend", as well as monsignors of the rank of protonotary apostolic de numero.

Eastern Orthodox
In the Eastern Orthodox tradition, archbishops under the Ecumenical Patriarchate (those who are not the primates of autocephalous churches) and metropolitans are styled "The Most Reverend". Other bishops are styled "The Right Reverend".

Other denominations
In some modern Christian denominations, particularly amongst anglican churches, "The Most Reverend" is used to refer to archbishops and presiding bishops, or sometimes simply to senior pastors of churches.

References

Ecclesiastical styles